This list of tallest buildings in Oklahoma ranks skyscrapers and highrises in the US state of Oklahoma by height. It is tied with the Park Tower in Chicago for the 43rd tallest building in the United States.

Tallest buildings
The following is a list of buildings in Oklahoma over 115 meters in height. All buildings listed here are in Oklahoma City or Tulsa: seven buildings in Oklahoma City and eight in Tulsa. The tallest building in Oklahoma outside these two cities is the Phillips Petroleum Building in Bartlesville, Oklahoma at 292 ft.

See also
List of tallest buildings in Oklahoma City
List of tallest buildings in Tulsa
List of tallest buildings by U.S. state
List of tallest buildings in the United States

References

Tallest
Oklahoma